Bomberman Online is a multiplayer video game developed for the Dreamcast console platform. The game is part of the Bomberman franchise and includes various multiplayer game modes. The game's online servers were shut down in 2003, restricting players to offline-only multiplayer modes.

Gameplay 

The gameplay of the Bomberman franchise consists of combat in a maze, using stationary timed explosives to attack with the blast down corridors. Bomberman and Bomberman Online have multiple game modes:

Multiplayer game modes 
Survival Rule
It's the original Bomberman battle mode. The last player standing wins. This mode is played when fighting against the Electric Dragons. The boss of this stadium is Thunder Bomber.
Hyper Bomber Rule
A newer addition to the Bomberman series, the objective is to collect 3 target panel power-ups, and navigate to the center of the map. A large explosion then eliminates everything except the player. A skull circles the player for each target panel collected. All of the target panels are lost upon death. This mode is played when fighting against the Red Phoenix. The bosses of this stadium are the Bomber Brothers.
Submarine Rule
This game is almost identical to Battleship, except that it occurs in real time. In gameplay, the player places a bomb with a timer, which will move to the adjacent spot on the other side once the timer runs out. The mode is played when fighting against the Princess Mariners. The boss of this stadium is Bomber Mermaid.
Panel Paint Rule
The objective of this mode is to color as many squares as possible. Squares can only be colored by explosions caused by the player and will turn into the player's color. All squares become brown upon death. This mode is played when fighting against the Iron Bulldozers. The boss of this stadium is Bomber Gun Rock.
Ring Match Rule
The goal here is to gain points by eliminating opponents, while avoiding being eliminated. If the player dies, they are respawned back onto the playing field. This mode is played when fighting against the Storm Giants. The boss of this stadium is Aladdin Bomber.

Synopsis 
Bomberman enters the Bomblympics to retain his title as the hero of Planet Bomber. The Bomblympics pit its combatants in a series of trials against one another, with six contestants - Bomberman being one of them. The contestants must make it inside each of the other contestants' designated bases to set up their trials. Each contestant must run through the trials and make it to the contestant's throne room where in a duel they must attempt to defeat one another. The opposing contestants are the Electric Dragons, Red Phoenix, Princess Mariners, Iron Bulldozers and the Storm Giants. Being the current hero of Planet Bomber, Bomberman gets the chance to go first, and he makes his way through each of the other five bases of the other contestants, winning every time. None of the other contestants are ever even given a chance to compete because of Bomberman's skill. In the end, Bomberman wins the Bomblympics and retains his championship title of the hero of Planet Bomber.

Reception 

Bomberman Online was met with mostly positive reception from critics and reviewers alike since its release.

References

External links 
 Bomberman Online at GameFAQs
 Bomberman Online at Giant Bomb
 Bomberman Online at MobyGames

2001 video games
Online
Dreamcast games
Dreamcast-only games
Hudson Soft games
Maze games
Multiplayer video games
North America-exclusive video games
Party video games
Sega video games
Video games with cel-shaded animation
Video games developed in Japan
H.a.n.d. games